Anna Khristoforovna Aglatova (born as ; born 4 March 1982 in Kislovodsk) is a Russian soprano singer.

Career
Aglatova was born in Kislovodsk and by 2004 joined the singing department of the Gnessin State Musical College. Prior to it, she was a recipient of the Sergei Leiferkus grant from the Vladimir Spivakov Fund and in 2005 made her first public appearance at the Bolshoi Theatre. Her career there, have not started with ease since her father didn't want her to work for Bolshoi. In 2003, she was a recipient of the first prize at the Bella voce International Competition and the same year participated at both the Christmas Festival at Düsseldorf and the fourteenth annual Chaliapin Season at Mineralnye Vody. She also was a participant for Irina Arkhipova Fund and was a part of the Novosibirsk Opera and Ballet Theatre. There, in 2006, she sang the role of Susanna at The Marriage of Figaro which was performed at the Moscow International Performance Arts Center and was directed by Tatjana Guerbaca while Teodor Currentzis was its conductor. In 2008 she became an All-Russian Festival winner, and next year became Triumph prize recipient.

Bolshoi Theatre
Falstaff — Nannetta
Die Zauberfloete — Pamina and Papagena
Boris Godunov — Xenia
Turandot —Liu
The Queen of Spades — Prilepa
The Love for Three Oranges — Ninetta
The Children of Rosenthal — Tanya 
The Legend of the Invisible City of Kitezh — Sirin
La bohème — Musetta
Carmen — Micaela
Die Fledermaus — Adele
The Tsar's Bride — Marfa
L'enfant et les sortileges — A widower bat, An owl, A shepherdess Lisa (La sonnambula) 
L’Elisir d’Amore — Adina
Alcina — main role
Don Giovanni — Donna Anna
The Tale of Tsar Saltan — Swan Queen
Faust — Marguerite

References

External links

Anna Aglatova - Armenian National Music

Living people
1982 births
People from Kislovodsk
Russian operatic sopranos
Gnessin State Musical College alumni
21st-century Russian opera singers
21st-century Russian women singers
21st-century Russian singers